Storgatan is a street in Stockholm city centre. Two churches are located on the street, Hedvig Eleonora Church and Oscarskyrkan.

Streets in Stockholm